Janine Beermann (born 20 November 1983 in Wuppertal) is a German field hockey player who competed in the 2008 Summer Olympics. She studied sports and social sciences at University of Wuppertal and currently works as a teacher at a high school in Velbert.

References

External links
 

1983 births
Living people
German female field hockey players
Olympic field hockey players of Germany
Field hockey players at the 2008 Summer Olympics
Sportspeople from Wuppertal
NMHC Nijmegen players